Pseudoluperus is a genus of leaf beetles in the family Chrysomelidae. There are 15 described species in Pseudoluperus.

Selected species
 Pseudoluperus cyanellus (Horn, 1895)
 Pseudoluperus decipiens (Horn, 1893)
 Pseudoluperus fulgidus Wilcox, 1965
 Pseudoluperus histrio (Horn, 1895)
 Pseudoluperus linus Wilcox, 1965
 Pseudoluperus longulus (J. L. LeConte, 1857)
 Pseudoluperus maculicollis (J. L. LeConte, 1884)
 Pseudoluperus spretus (Horn, 1893)
 Pseudoluperus texanus (Horn, 1893)
 Pseudoluperus tuberculatus (Blake, 1942)
 Pseudoluperus wickhami (Horn, 1893)

References

 Riley, Edward G., Shawn M. Clark, and Terry N. Seeno (2003). "Catalog of the leaf beetles of America north of Mexico (Coleoptera: Megalopodidae, Orsodacnidae and Chrysomelidae, excluding Bruchinae)". Coleopterists Society Special Publication no. 1, 290.

Galerucinae
Chrysomelidae genera